Amelia Murray may refer to:

 Amelia Jane Murray (1800–1896), Scottish artist
 Amelia Matilda Murray (1795–1885), British botanist and writer
 Amelia Murray (born 1993), New Zealand singer, songwriter and multi-instrumentalist, known professionally as Fazerdaze
 Amelia Murray, bass guitarist for Spacey Jane from 2016 to 2019